Majboor may refer to:
 Majboor (1964 film), an Indian drama film
 Majboor (1974 film), an Indian Bollywood crime thriller film,
 Majboor (1989 film), a Bollywood action film